Angelo Maria Cicolani (4 April 1952 – 27 October 2012) was an Italian politician. He was a Member of the Italian Senate from 2001 until his death, and a Quaestor in the Senate from 2011. Cicolani died in October 2012 after a long illness. He was 60.

References

External links
 Angelo Maria Cicolani: XIV Senate, XV Senate, XVI Senate at the Italian Senate website

1952 births
2012 deaths
Members of the Senate of the Republic (Italy)
Forza Italia politicians
The People of Freedom politicians
21st-century Italian politicians
People from the Province of Rieti